White on Blonde is the fourth studio album by Scottish rock band Texas, released by Mercury Records on 3 February 1997. The album was the band's first number one on the UK Albums Chart, and became their biggest seller. It has been certified 6× Platinum by the British Phonographic Industry for shipments of over 1.8 million copies, and has sold 1.65 million as of January 2017.

Following an endorsement by then Radio 1 presenter Chris Evans on his Channel 4 show TFI Friday in 1997, Texas came back to the music scene with the international hit "Say What You Want". The song was released internationally on 6 January 1997 and became the band's highest-peaking single to date on the UK Singles Chart, reaching No. 3 in its second week of release.

A total of five singles were taken from the album, all of which were top-ten hits in the UK. "Halo", released in April 1997, peaked at No. 10, "Black Eyed Boy", released in July 1997, peaked at No. 5, and "Put Your Arms Around Me", released in November 1997, also peaked at No. 10. In 1998, the Autumn Breeze remix of the song used as the end credits song to the film Ever After: A Cinderella Story, starring Drew Barrymore. The band then released a double A-sided single of "Insane" along with "Say What You Want (All Day, Every Day)"—a new version of the first hit from the album but now with additional rap vocals from the Wu-Tang Clan. The single peaked at No. 4 in the UK.

Background and release
The album includes five UK Top Ten singles: "Say What You Want" (UK  3), "Halo" (UK No. 10), "Black Eyed Boy" (UK No. 5), "Put Your Arms Around Me" (UK No. 10) and "Insane" (UK No. 4), the latter released as a double A-sided single with "Say What You Want (All Day, Every Day)", a new version of the 1997 hit featuring additional rap vocals by the Wu-Tang Clan.

White on Blonde has been certified 6× Platinum in the UK, which indicates sales of over 1.8 million copies in that territory. The album was also a major success in various European countries, such as France where it peaked at #2 on the French Album Charts. The album was produced by the band themselves, along with Mike Hedges and former Eurythmics star Dave Stewart.

Honours
White on Blonde has received many honours since its release in 1997. It was voted the 86th greatest album of all time by Q magazine readers in 1998. The album is also ranked #34 in Q's "Best 50 Albums of Q's Lifetime," included in Q magazine's "90 Best Albums of the 1990s," and included in Q magazine's "50 Best Albums of 1997."

White on Blonde became the first Texas album to top the UK Album Charts and is one of only two Texas albums (along with The Greatest Hits) to be certified 6× Platinum in the United Kingdom.

In 2010, White on Blonde was nominated in the BRIT Awards Best Album in the past 25 years.

On the other hand, White on Blonde was voted the worst Scottish album ever in a 2007 online poll of music fans.

Track listing

Personnel
Texas
Sharleen Spiteri – vocals, guitar
Ally McErlaine – guitar
Johnny McElhone – bass guitar
Eddie Campbell – keyboards, vocals 
Richard Hynd – drums

Other Personnel
Roger Ward – guitar
Paul Taylor – programming
Alex Silva – programming, keyboards
Terry Disley – programming, keyboards
Martin Greene – string arrangement
Claire Miles – strings
Anne Stephenson – strings
Sally Herbert – strings
Claire Orsler – strings
Susan Dench – strings
Gini Ball – strings
Chris Pitsillide – strings
Steven Granville – backing vocals

Charts

Weekly charts

Year-end charts

Certifications and sales

|Worldwide
|
|4,000,000
|-

References

Texas (band) albums
1997 albums
Albums produced by Mike Hedges
Albums produced by David A. Stewart
Mercury Records albums
Albums recorded at The Church Studios